The following is a timeline of the history of the city of Tripoli, Libya.

Prior to 19th century

 7th C. BCE
 Tripoli was founded by Phoenicians
 Cyrenaica (eastern coastal region of Libya) colonized by the Greeks 
 2nd C. BCE - Romans in power.
 163 CE - Roman Triumphal Arch built (approximate date).
 533- Successful recovered by Byzantines of Egypt
 643 - Rashidun caliphate subdued Tripoli.
 1140 - Normans in power in Tripolitania.
 1149 - Tripoli pillaged by the Normans of Sicily.
 1401 - Tripoli was reconquered by the Tunisians.
 1510 - 25 July: Spanish forces captured the city;  it remained under Spanish rule for the next two decades.
 1530 - Tripoli granted to the Knights Hospitaller; it remained under their rule for the next two decades.
 1551 - August: City besieged by Ottoman forces led by Sinan Pasha, Turgut Reis, and Murad Agha.
 1556 - Cathedral mosque built.
 1559 - St. Peter fortress built.
 1604 - Iskandar Pasha hammam built.
 1610 - Jama'a al-Naqa'a (mosque of the camel) restored.
 1654 - Uthman Pasha Madrasa built.
 1670 - Sidi Salem (building) restored.
 1671 - Darghouth Turkish Bath established.
 1675 - Conflict between Barbary corsairs and British naval forces.
 1680 - Mosque of Mahmud Khaznadar built.
 1699 - Mosque of Muhammad Pasha built.
 1711 - Ahmed Karamanli in power.
 1736 - Ahmad Pasha al-Qarahmanli mosque built.

19th century
 1801 - First Barbary War begins.
 1804 - Second Battle of Tripoli Harbor.
 1815 - Second Barbary War.
 1823 - Population: 15,000.
 1825 - August: Battle of Tripoli.
 1834 - Gurgi Mosque built.
 1835 - Ottomans in power.
 1846 - Santa Maria degli Angeli church built.
 1858 - Arab demonstrations.
 1859 - Technical school established.
 1860 - Bab el-Jedid (gate) opens.
 1870 - Torre dell'Orologio built.
 1879 - Primary schools open.
 1882 - Population: 25,000.
 1883 - Royal Italian School opens.

20th century

 1911
 Italo-Turkish War
 Population: 29,869.
 1919 - Archaeological Museum established in the Red Castle
 1924 - Lungomare Conte Volpi constructed.
 1925
 Tripoli Grand Prix begins.
 Grand Hotel built.
 1927 - Tripoli International Fair begins.
 1928 - Tripoli Cathedral, Miramare Theatre, and Bank of Italy building constructed.
 1929 - Governor's Palace built.
 1935 - Suq al-Mushir reconstructed.
 1937 - March: Mussolini visits city.
 1938
 Population: 108,240.
 Italian military airfield built.
 1939 - 7 October Stadium built.
 1943
 Allied forces in power; British occupation begins.
 British military airport Castel Benito in operation.
 1944
 Al-Ittihad Sport, Cultural and Social Club formed.
 United States military base built at Wheelus Field.
 1950 - Al-Ahly Sports Club formed.
 1951 - City becomes capital of United Libyan Kingdom.
 1953 - Almadina Sporting Club formed.
 1964 - Population: 213,506.
 1973
 University of Tripoli established.
 Population: 551,477.
 1975 - Misurata-Tripoli highway constructed.
 1978
 Libyan Studies Center opens.
 Tripoli International Airport renovated.
 1982
 June 11 Stadium opens.
 Grand Hotel Tripoli built.
 1986 - 15 April - Aerial bombing by United States forces.
 1990 - That El Emad Towers built.
 2000 - GMR Stadium opens.

21st century

 2011
 17–25 February: Tripoli protests and clashes.
 20–28 August: Battle of Tripoli.
 11 October: Tripoli International Airport re-opens.
 14 October: Tripoli clashes.
 Population: 1,127,000.
 2012 - General National Congress begins meeting in Ghabat Al Nasr Convention Centre.
 2020 - Since January 6, 2020, GNA started entering the town, recapturing it from LNA.

See also
 Tripoli history
 Pasha of Tripoli
 Tripolitania
 Timeline of Benghazi

References

This article incorporates information from the Italian Wikipedia.

Bibliography

Published in 19th century
 
 . v.1
 
 
 
 
 

Published in 20th century
 
 
 
 
  via Google Books
 
 Ward, Philip. 1969. Tripoli: Portrait of a City. Cambridge, England: The Oleander Press,
 Warfelli, Muhammad. 1976. The Old City of Tripoli. Art and Archaeology Research Papers.
 
 

Published in 21st century

External links

  (Images, etc.)
  (Images, etc.)
  (Images, etc.)
  (Bibliography)
  (Bibliography)
  (Bibliography)
 

tripoli
 
Tripoli
Tripoli, Libya
Years in Libya
Tripoli